The 2000 U.S. Figure Skating Championships took place between February 6 and 13, 2000 at the Gund Arena in Cleveland, Ohio. Medals were awarded in four colors: gold (first), silver (second), bronze (third), and pewter (fourth) in four disciplines – men's singles, ladies' singles, pair skating, and ice dancing – across three levels: senior, junior, and novice.

The event was used to determine the U.S. teams for the 2000 World Championships, 2000 Four Continents Championships, and the 2000 World Junior Championships.

Senior results

Men

Ladies

Pairs

Ice dancing

Junior results

Men

Ladies

Pairs

Ice dancing

Novice results

Men

Ladies

Pairs

Ice dancing

External links
 2000 United States Figure Skating Championships

U.S. Figure Skating Championships
United States Figure Skating Championships, 2000
United States Figure Skating Championships, 2000
Sports competitions in Cleveland
February 2000 sports events in the United States